
Kolno County is a unit of territorial administration and local government (powiat) in Podlaskie Voivodeship, north-eastern Poland. It came into being on January 1, 1999, as a result of the Polish local government reforms passed in 1998.

As of 2019 its total population is 38,249, out of which the population of Kolno is 10,214, that of Stawiski is 2,174, and the rural population is 25,861.

Neighbouring counties
Kolno County is bordered by Pisz County to the north, Grajewo County to the north-east, Łomża County to the south and Ostrołęka County to the west.

Administrative division
The county is subdivided into six gminas (one urban, one urban-rural and four rural). These are listed in the following table, in descending order of population.

References

External links
 The Digital Archive of Kolno Land www.kolnoteka.pl (CAZK)

 
Kolno